Alec Coles OBE FRSA (born 3 January 1959) has been CEO of Western Australian Museum since March 2010.

He was educated at the University of Leicester (BSc), Newcastle University and the University of East Anglia. He was previously Chief Executive of the Northumberland Wildlife Trust and Director of Tyne & Wear Archives & Museums.

Coles is a Fellow of the Royal Society of Arts (FRSA), and was appointed an Officer of the Order of the British Empire (OBE) in the 2010 Birthday Honours, "for services to museums".

He was awarded an honorary degree: Doctor of Letters (D.Litt) by the University of Western Australia in 2017.

In 2021, Coles was named Western Australian of the Year in the Arts and Culture category of the Celebrate WA 'WA Day' Awards.

References

1959 births
Living people
Alumni of the University of Leicester
Australian art curators
British art curators
Officers of the Order of the British Empire
People from Wolverhampton